The Regius Chair of Law at the University of Glasgow was founded in December 1713 with an endowment by Queen Anne. (Its foundation is sometimes incorrectly dated to 1712, due to an error in Glasgow's Munimenta, published in 1854. ) It is one of twelve Regius Professorships within the University of Glasgow. The first holder of the chair, William Forbes, was appointed in 1714. The current holder, James Chalmers, was appointed in 2012.

Regius Professors of Law
 William Forbes MA (1714)
 William Cross, Advocate (1746)
 Hercules Lindsay LLD (1750)
 John Millar, advocate (1761)
 Robert Davidson LLD (1801)
 Allan Alexander Wellwood Maconochie LLD (1842)
 George Skene, Advocate (1855)
 Robert Berry MA LLD (1867)
 Alexander Moody Stuart LLD (1887)
 William Gloag KC BA LLD (1905)
 Andrew Dewar Gibb MBE QC MA LLD (1934)
 David Maxwell Walker CBE QC MA PhD LLD FRSE FBA (1958)
 Joe Thomson LLB FRSE (1991)
 James Chalmers LLB LLM Dip LP (2012)

See also
List of Professorships at the University of Glasgow
University of Glasgow School of Law

References
Who, What and Where: The History and Constitution of the University of Glasgow.  Compiled by Michael Moss, Moira Rankin and Lesley Richmond

Law
Professorships in law
1713 establishments in Scotland
Law